Miguel Ángel Chico Herrera (born in Irapuato, Guanajuato on March 17, 1961) is a Mexican lawyer and politician affiliated with the Institutional Revolutionary Party (PRI).
He was President of the party, charge that he held from 2005 to 2009.  In March 2006 he became the PRI candidate to the governorship of Guanajuato, for the 2006 Guanajuato elections held on July 2, 2006.
Chico has also  run to mayor of Celaya, local deputy and federal deputy.  He has been director of the newspaper El Sol del Bajío in his native Guanajuato.
He is currently a Local Congressman for the State of Guanajuato and the representative of all Local Congress in Mexico before the America's Parliamentary Confederation (COPA)

He resides in Guanajuato, Guanajuato and is married to Maria Eugenia Rodríguez Nieto and has a son, Alfonso and a daughter Eugenia.

References

External links
 Profile at Legislative Information System

1961 births
Living people
Politicians from Guanajuato
People from Irapuato
Institutional Revolutionary Party politicians
20th-century Mexican lawyers
Universidad de Guanajuato alumni
Members of the Congress of Guanajuato
Members of the Senate of the Republic (Mexico)
21st-century Mexican politicians
Senators of the LXII and LXIII Legislatures of Mexico